Plateros flavoscutellatus is a species of net-winged beetle in the family Lycidae. It is found in North America.

References

Further reading

 

Lycidae
Articles created by Qbugbot
Beetles described in 1914